Sing Sing (1957  – 22 April 1972) was a British Thoroughbred racehorse and sire. He was the leading British two-year-old of 1959, when he was unbeaten in six races including the National Breeders' Produce Stakes and the Cornwallis Stakes. As a three-year-old he failed to win in three races, being narrowly beaten in the King's Stand Stakes and the King George Stakes. He was then retired to stud where he had considerable success as a sire of sprinters. He died in 1972.

Background
Sing Sing was a powerfully built dark bay horse with a white blaze standing 16.1 hands high bred by his owner W. J. Stirling. He was sired by Tudor Minstrel, the winner of the 2000 Guineas in 1947 and the leading colt of his generation in Britain. Tudor Minstrel's other progeny included the Kentucky Derby winner Tomy Lee. His dam Agin the Law was a great-granddaughter on the influential broodmare whose other descendants included Tourbillon, Darshaan, Akiyda and Sinndar. Stirling sent his horse into training with J F Watts at his Wroughton House stable in Newmarket.

Racing career

1959: two-year-old season
Sing Sing began his racing career by winning the Pampisford Stakes at Newmarket Racecourse and followed up by winning the Scarborough Stakes at Doncaster. He was moved up in class for the National Stakes over five furlongs at Sandown Park Racecourse and won from Redgauntlet and Lombard. He won the Prince of Wales's Stakes at York Racecourse and the Rous Stakes before contesting the Cornwallis Stakes over five furlongs at Ascot on 10 October. Ridden by the champion jockey Doug Smith he started at odds of 4/6 and won from Queensberry and Sound Track.

1960: three-year-old season
Sing Sing did not race until June, when he ran in the King's Stand Stakes at Royal Ascot. He started odds-on favourite but after leading for most of the way he was caught in the closing strides and beaten a neck by Sound Track. At Goodwood Racecourse Sing Sing was made odds-on favourite for the King George Stakes. In a repeat of his Ascot run he led until the final stages before being overtaken by the four-year-old Bleep Bleep. On his final appearance at York in August Sing Sing finished unplaced behind Bleep Bleep in the Nunthorpe Stakes.

Assessment
In the 1959 Free Handicap, an official assessment of the best two-year-olds to race in Britain, Sing Sing was the top-rated juvenile of the year by a margin of three pounds. The independent Timeform organisation awarded Sing Sing a rating of 134, making him the best two-year-old of 1959. In their book, A Century of Champions, based on the Timeform rating system, John Randall and Tony Morris rated Sing Sing as the twenty-eighth best two-year-old trained in Britain and Ireland in the 20th century.

Stud record
Sing Sing was retired from racing to become a breeding stallion and had a successful stud career until his death on 22 April 1972 from hemorrhage related to enteritis. The best of his offspring, most of which were specialist sprinters, included,

Celtic Song (bay colt 1963), won Champagne Stakes
Manacle (bay colt 1964), sire of Moorestyle
Klaizia (bay filly 1965), dam of Lypheor who sired Royal Heroine and Tolomeo
Jukebox (bay colt 1966), won Stewards' Cup
Song (bay colt 1966), won Temple Stakes, King's Stand Stakes, Diadem Stakes, sire of Lochsong
Mummy's Pet (bay colt 1968), won Temple Stakes sire of Mister Wonderful (American Handicap), and the undefeated Precocious
Singing Bede (bay colt 1969), won King George Stakes, Palace House Stakes
African Sky (bay colt 1970), won Prix de la Forêt, sire of Kilijaro and African Song
Saulingo (brown colt 1970), won Temple Stakes, Prix du Gros Chêne
Averof (brown colt 1971), won St James's Palace Stakes

Pedigree

References

1957 racehorse births
1972 racehorse deaths
Racehorses bred in the United Kingdom
Racehorses trained in the United Kingdom
Thoroughbred family 13-c